= Haim Waxman =

Israeli diplomat

Ambassador Haim Waxman
- חיים וקסמן

Israel's Deputy Ambassador to the United Nations
- In office 16 August 2010 – 16 July 2013

Personal details
- Born: Israel
- Education: Hebrew University of Jerusalem

Haim Waxman (Hebrew: חיים וקסמן) was Israel’s Deputy Permanent Representative to the United Nations from 2010 until 2013. Prior to that posting, he served as the Director of the Department for Non-Proliferation in the Strategic Affairs Division of the Ministry of Foreign Affairs. He also served as interim Acting Deputy Director-General for Strategic Affairs.

== Education ==
Waxman holds a bachelor's degree in Russian and General Studies from the Hebrew University in Jerusalem (1990) and a master's degree in Public Policy from the University of Tel-Aviv (2005).

== Diplomatic career ==
Ambassador Waxman is a career diplomat. Before serving as Deputy Israeli Ambassador to the United Nations, he served as the Director of the Department for Non-Proliferation in the Strategic Affairs Division of the Ministry of Foreign Affairs. He also served as interim Acting Deputy Director-General for Strategic Affairs.

While heading the Department for Defence Export Controls in the Ministry of Foreign Affairs between 2005 and 2007, he was closely involved in the reform of the national system of export controls and legislation. During this period, he was a member of the United Nations Group of Experts on Illicit Brokering in Small Arms and Light Weapons.

Waxman served as Counsellor at the Permanent Mission of Israel to the United Nations office in Geneva from 1999 until 2004 where he represented Israel in various organisations and programs including the International Labour Organisation (ILO), the World Health Organisation (WHO) the International Telecommunication Union (ITU), the United Nations Conference on Trade and Development (UNCTAD), the World Intellectual Property Organisation (WIPO), the Economic Commission for Europe (ECE), and various environmental organisations.

From 1992 to 1996, Waxman served as Consul and Deputy Chief of Mission at the Israeli Consulate General in Toronto, Canada, where he oversaw public relations, community relations as well as consular work and administration. He also held other positions in the Ministry of Foreign Affairs, including in the African Division (2004), and the Middle East Economic Department (1998-1999).
